Cora is an unincorporated community in Degognia Township, Jackson County, Illinois, United States. Degognia Creek flows past the community and enters the Mississippi River approximately 1.5 miles to the south. Illinois Route 3 passes the north side of the site.

References

Unincorporated communities in Jackson County, Illinois
Unincorporated communities in Illinois